Henry Boteler (fl. 1413–1427), of Horsham, Sussex, was an English politician.

Family
Boteler was the son of Henry Boteler, also an MP for Horsham.

Career
He was a Member (MP) of the Parliament of England for Horsham in May 1413, March 1416, December 1421, 1422 and 1427.

References

Year of birth missing
Year of death missing
People from Horsham
English MPs May 1413
English MPs March 1416
English MPs December 1421
English MPs 1422
English MPs 1427